Denisa Saková (born 17 April 1976) is a Slovak politician, member of Hlas – SD and former Minister of Interior of Slovakia from April 2018 to March 2020.

Saková studied Engineering management at University of Economics in Bratislava. She subsequently worked in various companies in the IT industry. First of all at DELTA E.S., a.s. as a consultant. Between 2001 and 2003 she worked for Cap Gemini Ernst & Young in Bratislava and Berlin. From 2003 to 2007, Saková worked for E.ON IT Slovakia, s.r.o. as Director of the Application Department. 

She then worked for the Ministry of Interior under Minister Robert Kaliňák as Secretary of State. 

She was appointed Minister of Interior on 26 April 2018 by President Andrej Kiska.

She was succeeded as Minister of Interior by Roman Mikulec (OĽaNO) after the 2020 Slovak parliamentary election.

References 

1976 births
Living people
Direction – Social Democracy politicians
Members of the National Council (Slovakia) 2020-present
Interior ministers of Slovakia
Female interior ministers
Women government ministers of Slovakia
21st-century Slovak women politicians
21st-century Slovak politicians
University of Economics in Bratislava alumni
Female members of the National Council (Slovakia)